The Səbail FK 2018-19 season was Səbail's second Azerbaijan Premier League season, and their third season in existence. They finished the season in third position, qualifying for the UEFA Europa League for the first time. Sabail also entered the Azerbaijan Cup, reaching the Quarterfinals before defeat to Zira.

Season Events

Squad

Transfers

In

Loans in

Out

Released

Friendlies

Competitions

Overview

Premier League

Results summary

Results

League table

Azerbaijan Cup

Squad statistics

Appearances and goals

|-
|colspan="14"|Players away on loan:
|-
|colspan="14"|Players who left Sabail during the season:

|}

Goal scorers

Clean sheets

Disciplinary record

References

Azerbaijani football clubs 2018–19 season